Adams County Industrial Development Authority is a municipal authority providing financing for manufacturing firms, 501(c)(3) organizations, and "federally defined exempt facilities" businesses in Adams County, Pennsylvania.

References

Government of Adams County, Pennsylvania
Municipal authorities in Pennsylvania
Industrial development agencies